Jan Smolík (born 24 December 1942) is a Czech former cyclist. His sporting career began with Dukla Brno. He competed at the 1964 Tokyo and 1968 Mexico City Summer Olympics. He won the Peace Race in 1964.

References

External links
 

1942 births
Living people
Czech male cyclists
Olympic cyclists of Czechoslovakia
Cyclists at the 1964 Summer Olympics
Cyclists at the 1968 Summer Olympics
People from Lipník nad Bečvou
Sportspeople from the Olomouc Region